Fatehgarh Sahib Lok Sabha constituency is one of the 13 Lok Sabha (parliamentary) constituencies of Punjab state in northern India. This constituency came into existence as a part of the implementation of delimitation of parliamentary and assembly constituencies in 2008.

Assembly segments
The nine Vidhan Sabha (legislative assembly) segments of Fatehgarh Sahib Lok Sabha constituency are:
Before delimitation, Amloh, Khanna and Samrala assembly segments were in Ropar, Payal was in Ludhiana and Raikot was in Sangrur. Bassi Pathana, Fatehgarh Sahib, Amargarh and Sahnewal assembly segments were created as a part of delimitation of assembly constituencies in 2008.

Members of Parliament

Election results

General election 2019

General election 2014

General election 2009

See also
 Ropar Lok Sabha constituency
 List of Constituencies of the Lok Sabha

Notes

External links
Fatehgarh Sahib lok sabha  constituency election 2019 result details

Lok Sabha constituencies in Punjab, India
Fatehgarh Sahib district
Ludhiana district